Ray Finn (2 January 1926 – 23 June 2000) was an Australian rules footballer who played with Essendon in the Victorian Football League (VFL).

Notes

External links 		
		
		
		
		
		

1926 births
2000 deaths
Australian rules footballers from Victoria (Australia)
Essendon Football Club players